Joseph Blount Cheshire, Jr. (March 27, 1850 – December 27, 1932) was a bishop of North Carolina in The Episcopal Church.

Education
Cheshire was born on March 27, 1850, in Tarboro, North Carolina, the son of the Reverend Joseph Blount Cheshire and Elizabeth Toole Parker. He was educated at Trinity College from where he earned his B.A. in 1869 and M.A. in 1872. He received the Doctor of Divinity from the University of North Carolina in 1890 and another from the Sewanee: The University of the South in 1894.

Ordination
Cheshire was ordained as a deacon on April 21, 1878, and as a priest on May 30, 1880. Between 1878 and 1881, he served as the rector of the Chapel of the Cross in Chapel Hill, North Carolina. He was later appointed the rector of [[St Peter's Church in Charlotte, North Carolina and served between 1881 and 1893.

Episcopacy
Cheshire was elected coadjutor bishop of North Carolina in 1893 and was consecrated on October 15, 1893, by Bishop Theodore B. Lyman of North Carolina. He succeeded Bishop Lyman on December 13, 1893.

Personal life
Cheshire married Annie Huske Webb on December 17, 1874. After her death he married Elizabeth Lansdale on July 19, 1899.

References

External links
 

1850 births
1932 deaths
Episcopal Church in North Carolina
University of North Carolina alumni
Sewanee: The University of the South alumni
Episcopal bishops of North Carolina